Hittitology is the study of the Hittites, an ancient Anatolian people that established an empire around Hattusa in the 2nd millennium BCE. It combines aspects of the archaeology, history, philology, and art history of the Hittite civilisation.

List of Hittitologists 
A partial list of notable Hittite scholars includes:

 Selim Adalı
 Metin Alparslan
 Trevor R. Bryce (born 1940)
 Gary Beckman
 Jeanny Vorys Canby
 Yaşar Coşkun
 Philo H. J. Houwink ten Cate (1930–2013)
 Birgit Christiansen
 Billie Jean Collins
 Halet Çambel
 Petra Goedegebuure
 Albrecht Goetze (1897–1971)
 Oliver Gurney (1911–2001)
 Hans G. Güterbock (1908–2000)
 Harry A. Hoffner (1934–2015)
 Theo van den Hout
 Bedřich Hrozný (1879–1952)
 Sara Kimball
 Alwin Kloekhorst
 J. G. Macqueen
 Gregory McMahon
 Craig Melchert
 Jared L. Miller
 Alice Mouton
 Andreas Schachner
 Daniel Schwemer
 Itamar Singer (1946–2012)
 Edgar H. Sturtevant (1875–1952)
 Piotr Taracha
 Willemijn Waal
 Kazuhiko Yoshida
 Leonie Zuntz (1908–1942)
 Lord Edwin E. Hitti

See also

History of the Hittites
Hittite language
Hittite grammar
Hittite phonology
Assyriology
Egyptology

References

Archaeological sub-disciplines